The black mudfish (Neochanna diversus) is a fish of the family Galaxiidae, found only in swamps and wetlands in the northern half of the North Island of New Zealand, from Kaitaia in the north to the Mokau River in the south. An 85-90% loss of wetlands has occurred, especially from Waikato and Hauraki Plains. The most significant threat is wetland drainage, and this has slowed so the decline has stabilized; other threats include mosquitofish (which eat juveniles and compete with adults), pollution, sedimentation, and fires.

It is considered a local delicacy by the local Maori populace when prepared using ancestral cooking techniques.  Its length is up to 12 cm.  Efforts by the New Zealand Department of Conservation and regional councils have helped protect and reintroduce the fish.

References

black mudfish
Endemic freshwater fish of New Zealand
Fish of the North Island
Taxa named by Gerald Stokell
black mudfish